Lüneburg is a city in the District of Lüneburg in Lower Saxony, Germany.

The historical English spelling was Lunenburg.  Since the Elector of Brunswick-Lüneburg became King of Great Britain in 1707, many places in former British colonies also carry this name.

Places

Germany
 Lüneburg, a city in the District of Lüneburg in Lower Saxony, Germany
 Lüneburg (district), in Lower Saxony, Germany
 Principality of Lüneburg, 1269-1705
 Lüneburg Heath, a large area of heath, geest and woodland in northern Germany

Africa

 Lüneburg, Namibia, a populated place in Hardap, Namibia
 Luneburg, KwaZulu-Natal, a town in South Africa

Canada
Lunenburg, Nova Scotia
Lunenburg, Nova Scotia (municipal district)
Lunenburg County, Nova Scotia
Lunenburg (electoral district), Nova Scotia
Lunenburg (provincial electoral district), Nova Scotia
Lunenburg, Ontario, in Stormont, Dundas and Glengarry United Counties
North Lunenburg, Ontario

United States
Lunenburg, Arkansas
Lunenburg, Massachusetts, a New England town
Lunenburg (CDP), Massachusetts, the main village in the town
Lunenburg, Vermont, a New England town
Lunenburg (CDP), Vermont, the main village in the town
Lunenburg, Virginia
Lunenburg County, Virginia

Other uses
 Lüneberg cheese, made in Austria
 Luneburg lens
 Rudolf Luneburg (1903-1949), professor of mathematics and optics
 Kristen Luneberg, Miss North Carolina USA in 2003

See also
 Lindberg (disambiguation)
 Lindbergh (disambiguation)
 Lunenburg (disambiguation)